Boomerang is an American cable television network owned by Warner Bros. Discovery U.S. Networks, a subsidiary of Warner Bros. Discovery. 

A spin-off of Cartoon Network, the channel primarily broadcasts animated programming from the Warner Bros. Animation library, including Warner Bros. Cartoons and Hanna-Barbera productions among others, as well as contemporary reboots of classic franchises. From time to time, the channel has also broadcast reruns of Cartoon Network original series.

Boomerang debuted in 1992 as a programming block on Cartoon Network, dedicated to classic animation from the WB library, and was eventually spun-off into its own separate network in 2000. In the late 2000s, Boomerang would begin to airing more modern and contemporary programming, including reruns of shows that had previously aired on Cartoon Network. 

A 2015 relaunch (which aimed to promote Boomerang as a "second flagship" brand alongside Cartoon Network) saw Boomerang begin to produce its own original programming, with a focus on reboots of franchises such as Looney Tunes and Scooby-Doo. In 2017, Boomerang launched a subscription video on-demand over-the-top streaming service.

As of September 2018, Boomerang is available to approximately 38.312 million pay television households in the United States.

History

Turner Broadcasting System built up an extensive catalogue of MGM and early Warner Brothers cartoons in the 1980s. These made up much of the extensive children's programming on TBS and TNT, which was phased out after the creation of the Cartoon Network on October 1, 1992.

Boomerang was created as a new home for these and similar cartoons. It originated as a programming block on Cartoon Network that debuted on December 8, 1992. It originally aired for four hours every weekend, but the block's start time had changed frequently. The Saturday block moved to Saturday afternoons, then back to the early morning, and the Sunday block moved to Sunday evenings. Eventually, Boomerang was shortened by an hour, reducing it from four hours to three each weekend.

With Cartoon Network downplaying its archival programming in favor of newer original series, Turner Broadcasting System introduced a standalone Boomerang cable channel on April 1, 2000. The Cartoon Network block continued to run under the new Boomerang channel branding until October 3, 2004.

On February 4, 2014, as part of Turner Broadcasting's 2014 upfronts, it was announced that Boomerang would become advertising-supported,  and that there were plans to expand the brand globally. In October 2014, Cartoon Network unveiled a global rebranding for Boomerang, which first launched in Latin America in late September, and arrived in the United States on January 19, 2015. Alongside the previously-announced plan to introduce advertising, the network planned to introduce original programming for the first time, and place a particular focus on the archive's most well-known franchises with an explicitly family-friendly approach. Turner executives described the changes as being an effort to grow Boomerang into a "second flagship" on par with the main Cartoon Network channel.

In 2017, an online Boomerang video-on-demand service was launched. In 2018, 3rd Annual Shorty Social Good Awards nominated Boomerang and Captain Planet Foundation for Best in Entertainment. May 2020 saw the launch of HBO Max, a general entertainment video-on-demand service from Boomerang's corporate parent that includes much of Boomerang's programming.

Programming

Historically, Boomerang avoided overt channel drift and, despite adding newer content to its library, continued to air programming from the breadth of its archives. By spring 2014, however, most of its archival programming was relegated to graveyard slots while the daytime schedule became dominated by programming from the 1990s and later. This policy underwent a partial reversal in April 2017, with a larger focus on shows from the 2010s, before older Cartoon Network series returned to Boomerang's schedule from January 2018 to May 2019, and again in half-hour time slots in September 2020. Tom and Jerry, Looney Tunes, The Smurfs, and various entries in the Scooby-Doo franchise have more or less had permanent places on the schedule since the rebrand, while previous network mainstays The Flintstones and The Jetsons returned in a late-night time slot in July 2018 before leaving the schedule again in November of that year.

Not all of the Warner Bros. animation library is exclusive to Boomerang. A portion of that library which includes series produced in collaboration with Steven Spielberg's Amblin Entertainment (including Tiny Toon Adventures and most of Animaniacs), as well as most works involving Batman and Superman (such as the DC Animated Universe), is put out for license to other networks; those properties most recently aired on the Hub Network from late 2012 until its closure in October 2014. In addition, Warner Bros.'s collection of Christmas specials — including the latter half of the Rankin/Bass Productions library — is licensed to AMC for their Best Christmas Ever block as of 2018; those specials previously aired on Freeform and its predecessors for nearly 20 years, as part of their 25 Days of Christmas lineup. In 2019, former channel fixture The Flintstones was licensed out to MeTV; in 2021, that network introduced two morning blocks that feature Warner Bros. and Paramount Global content (including Looney Tunes/Merrie Melodies, Popeye, Betty Boop, and MGM theatrical shorts), many of which still air on Boomerang. MeTV also acquired another former Boomerang fixture in that year: The Jetsons.
 
Boomerang itself occasionally licenses programming from other distributors, such as with The Rocky and Bullwinkle Show (which joined the lineup for a short run in August and September 2013) and with Garfield and Friends (which joined in September 2019).

Although Boomerang's programming philosophy was originally intended to showcase classic cartoons, newer shows have been added in recent years, some even before the rebrand. From January to December 2012, new episodes of the Italian animated series Puppy in My Pocket: Adventures in Pocketville aired on the channel. Wedgies, a series of animated interstitials that previously aired on Cartoon Network, were reintroduced in 2013. In December 2014, Boomerang added Teen Titans Go! and The Amazing World of Gumball to its lineup, alongside their airings on Cartoon Network; those shows left in April 2017. On June 28, 2015, it was announced that Boomerang would receive original programs such as Wabbit (which was later re-titled New Looney Tunes for its second season), Be Cool, Scooby-Doo!, and an animated adaptation of Bunnicula. Throughout mid-2018, Boomerang added re-runs of modern Cartoon Network series to its lineup, including Regular Show, Mighty Magiswords, Adventure Time, and Steven Universe. On May 2, 2022, Boomerang brought back reruns of Teen Titans Go! and The Amazing World of Gumball, and also added two additional modern Cartoon Network shows to their schedule: Craig of the Creek and Total Dramarama.  Those shows left on October 28, 2022.

Boomerang has been used to burn off programs acquired for Cartoon Network which have rated too low to remain on that network's schedule, much like Nickelodeon's spin-off Nicktoons and TeenNick. Boomerang also simulcasts some episodes of original Cartoon Network programming, mainly season or series premieres and finales.

Programming blocks

Because of Boomerang's fluid schedule, programming blocks used to air for a few months, then be removed from the schedule, only to be added again a few months later, until they were almost all phased out in late 2014, due to the network's rebrand.

Current
 Boomerang Theater – Boomerang's movie showcase block.

Former blocks

 Boomeraction – One of the first blocks to air on Boomerang, its programming focused on action-adventure shows including Thundarr the Barbarian, Teen Titans, Samurai Jack, SWAT Kats: The Radical Squadron, The Pirates of Dark Water, Jonny Quest, The Secret Saturdays, Ben 10 (2005) and Ben 10: Omniverse. It was also one of the only Boomerang blocks to air across international feeds, including the United Kingdom, Latin America, and Australia versions of the network. The block was removed on June 1, 2014, as all programming from the block left the schedule.
 Boomerandom – This block aired each weekend from 8 to 10 p.m. Eastern Time from 2008 to 2010, and featured two hours of episodes of a single program. The selected programs were picked by the "Boomerandom drawing machine".
 The Boomerang Christmas Party – This block, which aired every December, features a collection of Hanna-Barbera Christmas specials (such as The Powerpuff Girls: Twas the Fight Before Christmas, Yogi's First Christmas, Christmas Comes to Pac-Land, Casper's First Christmas, The Jetsons' First Christmas and The Flintstones' Christmas).
 Boomerang Zoo – This one-hour block featured pre-1970 Hanna-Barbera/Warner Bros. television shorts, culled mainly from the H–B talking animal series (such as Yogi Bear,  Huckleberry Hound,  Atom Ant, Magilla Gorilla,  Snagglepuss, Wally Gator, and Pixie & Dixie and Mr. Jinks). It was the only block to air on both the American and European versions of the channel after the 2004 rebranding of Boomerang Europe.
 Boomerock – This block, which aired in commemoration of the 50th anniversary of the premiere of The Flintstones in 2010, consisted of a marathon of the classic animated series.
 Boomeroyalty (originally named Character of the Month from 2003 to 2012) – This weekend mini-marathon of shows focuses on a particular character that changes every month, similar to the former Super Chunk block on sister network Cartoon Network. "Boomeroyalty" concluded on July 22, 2012.
 Captain Planet – In observance of Earth Day, Boomerang aired a marathon of the animated series (which was produced by Turner Program Services) every year from 2005 to 2014. Continuing the tradition in a digital format, the network's streaming service offered the series in its entirety for a limited time in spring 2018.
 Mother's Day – A recent marathon observance by Boomerang, on the holiday, the channel airs cartoons featuring mothers, such as Jane Jetson-focused episodes of The Jetsons, and Wilma Flintstone-focused episodes of The Flintstones.
 Pet of the Week – This block showcases 2 hours of a single animated program, where the title character is an animal, such as Courage the Cowardly Dog, The Garfield Show, and What's New, Scooby-Doo?. Currently, the block has been reduced to 1 hour of a single program.
 Scooberang – This continuous block featured every episode of each Scooby-Doo series (which were aired in chronological order), beginning with Scooby-Doo, Where Are You!. It also aired some feature-length Scooby-Doo films, including Scooby-Doo Meets the Boo Brothers and Scooby-Doo on Zombie Island. "Scooberang" no longer airs on Boomerang. However, various series iterations of the Scooby-Doo franchise air on the channel several times daily.
 Those Meddling Kids! – This 90-minute block featured series produced by Hanna-Barbera and/or Ruby-Spears, all of which follow the formula of a group of mystery-solving teenagers or young adults (such as Scooby-Doo, Josie and the Pussycats, Fangface, Clue Club and Speed Buggy).
 Halloween block – This block aired during the month of October, and included Halloween-themed programs such as Scooby-Doo, Casper, The Addams Family (in its live-action as well as animated incarnations), Beetlejuice, The Funky Phantom, Goober and the Ghost Chasers and The Munsters. This is notably the only time that Boomerang regularly aired any live-action programming, particularly as The Addams Family and The Munsters have aired on the channel each October since 2011. The Halloween programming replaced the annual Scooberang block in 2011 and aired again in 2012 and 2013; it was not brought back in 2014 when the channel began to change focus.
 Weeknights at 8:30 – Boomerang's primetime premiere block, which debuted in October 2015 and aired new episodes of Be Cool, Scooby-Doo!, The Garfield Show, Shaun the Sheep, DreamWorks Dragons, and Sonic Boom. Following the block's closure in 2016, each show featured (sans DreamWorks Dragons) continued to air.

Special events
 Scoobtober – For the whole of October 2020, this block aired every day from 1:00 to 10:00 p.m. Eastern Time and featured various installments of the Scooby-Doo franchise (including the network premiere of Scooby-Doo and Guess Who?). Scooby-Doo films were also shown under the New Scooby Movies banner, every Sunday night at 8:00 p.m. ET.
 Boomerang Family Feast – Airing during the Thanksgiving weekend of 2020, this four-day marathon featured hour-long blocks of Boomerang's classic cartoons, including several programs that haven't aired regularly on the channel in years (such as The Yogi Bear Show, The Magilla Gorilla Show, The Huckleberry Hound Show, Popeye the Sailor, Top Cat, The Jetsons, The Flintstones, Jonny Quest, and Josie and the Pussycats).
 A Very Merry Jerry – For the whole of December 2020, this block aired every day from 4:00 to 9:00 p.m. Eastern Time and featured various installments of the Tom and Jerry franchise, as well as a different holiday special from Boomerang's library airing at 7:00 p.m. nightly. The movie slot previously featured direct-to-video Tom and Jerry films only, though they were later broadcast as part of an all-day marathon on Christmas Day.

Related services

International

Boomerang, originally established as a cable channel in the United States, has expanded worldwide. Each of these networks was aligned globally in 2015 under one unified branding to reflect a family co-viewing network.

See also

 Cartoon Network
 Cartoonito
 Tooncast
 Pogo

References

External links

 Official standalone website

 
1992 establishments in Georgia (U.S. state)
Children's television networks in the United States
Cartoon Network
Warner Bros. Discovery networks
Classic television networks
Nostalgia television in the United States
Television channels and stations established in 2000
Television networks in the United States
English-language television stations in the United States
Companies based in Atlanta
Companies based in Los Angeles